Allopseudaxinoides is a genus which belongs to the phylum Platyhelminthes and class Monogenea; all its species are parasites of fish. It was created by Yamaguti in 1965, to include Allopseudaxinoides euthynni.

Morphology
Species of Allopseudaxinoides are ectoparasites that affect their host by attaching themselves as larvae on the gills of the fish and grow into adult stage. This larval stage is called oncomiracidium, and is characterized as free swimming and ciliated. 
The name Allopseudaxine  is composed of a root  Allopseudaxine: a monogenean genus, and the suffix oides which means resembling. Thus, the name Allopseudaxinoides  means resembling  Allopseudaxine. In fact, species of Allopseudaxine have a large body tapering anteriorly, and a unilateral, oblique haptor, (which means that they have a single oblique row of clamps,) giving them a triangular appearance. By this triangular shape, they resemble  Allopseudaxine. However, species of Allopseudaxinoides can be distinguished from  Allopseudaxine by a complete
absence of vaginae or the presence of rudimentary ones, the presence of  thickenings of clamps capsule,  and an accessory clamp sclerite.

Species
Allopseudaxinoides comprises two species:
 Allopseudaxinoides euthynni Yamaguti, 1965
Allopseudaxinoides vagans (Ishii, 1936) Yamaguti, 1968

References

Axinidae
Monogenea genera
Parasites of fish